KSCZ-LD, virtual channel 16 (UHF digital channel 23), is a low-powered television station licensed to San Jose and San Francisco, California, United States. It broadcasts mostly Vietnamese-language programming from atop Mount Allison in unincorporated Alameda County. The station is owned by Venture Technologies Group. Until 2017, the station served the Central Coast media market.

History
The station originally signed on as K42DT on analog channel 42. It was owned by the Trinity Broadcasting Network. By 2002, the station was under the ownership of Venture Technologies Group, which continues to own it.

From 2002, the station became silent, and was granted a temporary authority license the following year by the FCC. In May 2006, the station owners moved the station's location from Coalinga Ridge in Coalinga, California to a transmitter site on Mt. San Benito, and changed the station's city of license to Greenfield, California.

KSCZ went silent at 4pm on Sunday, March 18, 2007, by Brian Holton of Venture Technology Group, licensee. Pending resolution of an FCC filing against it by Marty Jackson of Monterey, California, it was expected to return to the air serving Santa Cruz, California.

On October 11, 2007, KSCZ-LP was granted an original construction permit for a digital companion channel by the FCC under the callsign of KSCZ-LD. The digital station broadcast digitally on channel 20 from a transmitter site in Fremont Peak, from where other Salinas and Monterey-area broadcasters transmit.

KSCZ-LP went off the air on August 8, 2017, and resumed broadcasting on March 15, 2018. Several Vietnamese-language subchannels moved from KAXT-CD to KSCZ-LP. On June 1, the station changed its city of license to San Jose and San Francisco and began broadcasting from Mount Allison.

Programming
KSCZ-LD broadcasts mostly Vietnamese-language programming. Several of the digital subchannels are branded as San Jose stations and serve the Vietnamese American community in Santa Clara Valley. Quê Hương and VieTop originate locally in San Jose, while other subchannels are simulcasts of networks based in Los Angeles or Houston.

Digital subchannels

Former programming
It is unknown what programming the station previously broadcast, though it is assumed to have broadcast Trinity Broadcasting Network (TBN) network programming under TBN ownership. It also broadcast a moving test pattern consisting of a repeating hour showing ships sailing under the Golden Gate Bridge, as viewed from the Marin Headlands. Video for this test pattern was shot by 2006 Venture employee Frank Martin. Music on the audio playing during this 'test pattern' was original compositions from Steve Salani of orchestra.net. This 'test pattern' repeating hour broadcast continuously from sign on at the Mt. San Benito site on May 18, 2006 until sign off by Brian Holton.

Technical information
KSCZ-LP's broadcast antenna is located on Mount Allison, within the Sunol Regional Wilderness in unincorporated Alameda County, California, to the southeast of Fremont and to the north of San Jose.

KSCZ-LP can be viewed in Santa Clara, Alameda, San Mateo, and Santa Cruz counties, San Francisco, and parts of Contra Costa County. The station uses an ATSC transmitter with an effective radiated power of 3.6 kilowatts.

Before its move to the San Francisco Bay Area, KSCZ-LP broadcast from San Benito Mountain, near the historic mining town of New Idria. The frequency shift keying of the morse code version of the call letters KSCZ-LP could be heard by tuning towards channel 43 in Clovis, California.

See also
 Channel 23 low-power TV stations in the United States
 Channel 23 digital TV stations in the United States
 Channel 16 virtual TV stations in the United States
 KBKF-LD

References

External links
 
 Station location on Mt. San Benito
 Subchannel websites:
 Hải Lê TV 
 VCAL TV
 Quê Hương Television 
 Nét Việt 
 VBS Tivi 
 U Channel 

SCZ-LD
Low-power television stations in the United States
1981 establishments in California
Television channels and stations established in 1981
SCZ-LD
Television in San Jose, California